Neil Austin may refer to:
 Neil Austin (footballer) (born 1983), English footballer
 Neil Austin (lighting designer), English lighting designer

See also
 Neill Austin (1924–2008), New Zealand politician